The Leo Ring is an immense intergalactic cloud of hydrogen and helium gas some  in diameter, in orbit of two galaxies, in the center of the Leo Group of galaxies, within the constellation of Leo.

Observation history
Radio astronomers discovered the cloud in 1983. Astronomers had theorized that the ring was primordial gas in the process of forming a galaxy. The GALEX satellite detected ultraviolet emissions that astronomers at Johns Hopkins University and the Carnegie Institution for Science interpret to indicate star creation in newly forming dwarf galaxies in a 19 February 2009 Nature paper. In 2010, it was suggested that the gas was not primordial, but instead the result of a galactic collision between the two galaxies with which the ring is closely associated.

Formation history
It has been suggested that 1.2 billion years ago, NGC 3384 collided with M96, at the heart of the Leo Group, expelling a galaxy's worth of gas into intergalactic space. This gas gathered into a vast set of clouds, the Leo Ring.

The ring is composed of a collection of H I regions. A bridge of gas connects the ring to M96.

References

High-velocity clouds
Leo (constellation)
M96 Group
Astronomical objects discovered in 1983